Cağaloğlu Anatolian High School, in Cağaloğlu, İstanbul, is one of the oldest and internationally renowned high schools of Turkey. Istanbul Cağaloğlu Anatolian High School is considered to be an elite public high school in Turkey. The primary languages of instruction are Turkish and German. The secondary foreign language of instruction is English. Germany recognizes the school as a "" (German International school).

Education is four years after one prep year. Enrollment capacity is 150. The total number of students is 909 in 33 classes with an average class size of 5 to 34. As of August 2021, the high school has four administrative staff and 53 teaching staff. Enrollment is for German language education, four teachers from Germany are tasked along with seven experienced Turkish teachers. Graduates obtain a diploma "Deutsches Sprachdiplom" (DSD-A2/B1 or B2/C1), which proves German language proficiency required for entry to a college or to study at a university in Germany respectively.

Prior to Cağaloglu Anatolian High School the complex in which the school functions used to host Istanbul Girls High School. They also host a Model G20 summit for high school students.

Notable alumni
 Nejat İşler (born 1972), actor
Engin Hepileri (born 1979) actor
Dağhan Külegeç (born 1978) actor
Algı Eke (born 1985), actress
Sinem Öztürk (born 1985), actress
Sinan Kaynakçı (born 1979), lead vocalist of Pinhani band

See also
 Istanbul Girls High School

References

External links
 Official site (in Turkish)
 German International School (in German)
 Ranking (in Turkish)

Fatih
 
Educational institutions established in 1983
1983 establishments in Turkey
German-language schools
Anatolian High Schools